M. Sharon Lewis Malcolm (July 11, 1947 – September 30, 2019) was an American politician.

Malcolm was born in Park Lake, Michigan. She served in the West Virginia House of Delegates from 2018 until her death. Malcolm was a Republican. Prior to her appointment to the House of Delegates, she served as the Assistant Doorkeeper for the West Virginia House of Delegates, and later as the Assistant Sergeant-at-Arms for the West Virginia Senate.

Notes

1947 births
2019 deaths
People from Kanawha County, West Virginia
People from Osceola County, Michigan
Women state legislators in West Virginia
Republican Party members of the West Virginia House of Delegates
21st-century American women